Julia Eydenzon (born 12 June 1982) is a Russian sport shooter.

She participated at the 2018 ISSF World Shooting Championships, winning a medal.

References

External links

Living people
1982 births
Russian female sport shooters
Running target shooters
Sportspeople from Omsk